was a town located in Ika District, Shiga Prefecture, Japan. It is on the northern tip of Lake Biwa.

As of 2003, the town had an estimated population of 4,735 and a density of 70.62 persons per km². The total area was 67.05 km².

On January 1, 2010, Nishiazai, along with the towns of Kohoku and Torahime (both from Higashiazai District), and the towns of Kinomoto, Takatsuki and Yogo (all from Ika District), was merged into the expanded city of Nagahama. Higashiazai District and Ika District were both dissolved as a result of this merger.

References 

Dissolved municipalities of Shiga Prefecture
Nagahama, Shiga